Deh-e Khan (also Romanized as Deh-e Khān and Deh Khān; also known as Shahr Dān) is a village in Kavirat Rural District, Chatrud District, Kerman County, Kerman Province, Iran. At the 2006 census, its population was 20, in 4 families.

References 

Populated places in Kerman County